Sam Sifton (born June 5, 1966) is an American journalist and food editor at The New York Times. He was previously the paper's national editor. Sifton has also worked as deputy dining editor (2001); dining editor (2001–04); deputy culture editor (2004–2005), and culture editor (2005–2009).

Early life

Sifton was born on June 5, 1966 to the Hon. Charles Proctor Sifton, a senior district judge of the United States District Court for the Eastern District of New York, and Elisabeth Sifton, a senior vice president at Farrar, Straus & Giroux and author of The Serenity Prayer (2003). His maternal grandfather was the theologian Reinhold Niebuhr and his maternal grandmother was Ursula Niebuhr, the author of Remembering Reinhold Niebuhr (2001) and founder of the Barnard College Religion Department.

Sifton graduated magna cum laude from Harvard College with an A.B. degree in history and literature in 1988.

Career
Sifton began his journalism career as assistant editor for American Heritage magazine in 1988. From 1990 to 1994, he taught social studies in the New York City public school system.

Sifton held a number of positions at the weekly New York Press during his tenure there from 1990 to 1998, including restaurant critic, contributing editor, senior editor, media critic, and managing editor.

Sifton was a founding editor of Talk in 1998 before coming to the Times in 2001.

In October 2009, Sifton succeeded Frank Bruni as restaurant critic for the Times.  Sifton's last review as restaurant critic was published October 11, 2011. He was succeeded by Pete Wells.

Personal life
Sifton is married to Tina Fallon, an independent theatre producer, and resides in Brooklyn.

Works
Sifton, Sam, Malosh, D., & New York Times Company. (2021). The New York Times Cooking No Recipe Recipes. New York: Ten Speed Press. ISBN 1529109833. OCLC 1250363553

References

External links
Articles by Sam Sifton on the New York Times website

1966 births
Living people
Harvard College alumni
New York Press people
Talk (magazine) people
American male journalists
The New York Times editors
Place of birth missing (living people)
American restaurant critics
Critics employed by The New York Times